Notable people and alumni of Gadjah Mada University.

University Rectors

 M. Sardjito, 1st Rector (1949-1961)
 Herman Johannes, 2nd Rector (1961-1966)
 M. Nazir Alwi, 3rd Rector (1966-1967)
 Soepojo Padmodipoetro, 4th Rector (1967-1968)
 Soeroso Prawirohardjo, 5th Rector (1968-1973)
 Sukadji Ranuwihardjo, 6th Rector (1973-1981)
 Teuku Jacob, 7th Rector (1981-1986)
 Koesnadi Hardjosoemantri, 8th Rector (1986-1990)
 Mochamad Adnan, 9th Rector (1990-1994)
 Soekanto H. Reksohadiprodo, 10th Rector (1994-1998)
 Ichlasul Amal, 11th Rector (1998-2003)
 Sofian Effendi, 12th Rector (2003-2007)
 Sudjarwadi, 13th Rector (2007-2012)
 Pratikno, 14th Rector (2012-2014), resigned October 2014 on being appointed as State Secretary in the Joko Widodo administration
 Dwi Korita Karnawati, 15th Rector (2014–2017) and the first woman Rector of the University, appointed in November 2014
 Panut Mulyono, 16th Rector (2017–present)

Art and culture
Artika Sari Devi - Miss Indonesia Universe 2005, Top 15
Umar Kayam - author and former President of Jakarta Art Institute
Willibrordus S. Rendra - poet, lyricist, and stage writer; one of the most recognized poets in Indonesia

Education
Yahya A. Muhaimin - Minister of Education (1999-2001)
M. Suyanto founded a private university in Yogyakarta, on October 11, 1994. The university, STMIK Amikom, was highlighted as a leading example for “A New Dynamic: Private Higher Education” by UNESCO at World Conference on Higher Education 2009.

Economics
 Boediono - former Coordinating Minister of Economic Affairs; former governor of central Bank Indonesia; Vice President of Indonesia (2009-2014)
 J Soedrajad Djiwandono - Junior Minister of Trade (1988 - 1993), Governor of Central Bank Indonesia (1993-1998), Emeritus Professor of Economics at University of Indonesia, Professor at Graduate School of Nanyang Technological University, Singapore
 Perry Warjiyo - Governor, Bank Indonesia.

Health
 Odete Maria Freitas Belo – Minister of Health of East Timor
 Siti Fadillah Supari – Minister of Health (2004-2009).

Journalism
Jakob Oetama - founder of Kompas; CEO of Kompas Gramedia
Helmi Johannes - voice of America Executive Producer (2005-present)
Susanto Pudjomartono  - second chief editor of The Jakarta Post (1991–2003); Ambassador to Russia (2003–2008)

Politics
Joko Widodo - President of Indonesia (2014-present), former Governor of Jakarta and former Mayor of Surakarta
Sri Sultan Hamengkubuwono X - 10th Sultan of Yogyakarta
Amien Rais - former leader of Muhammadiyah, Chief of Majelis Permusyawaratan Rakyat - MPR (1999-2004), politician and founder of Partai Amanat Nasional
Airlangga Hartarto - Chairman of Golkar and Minister of Industry
Anies Baswedan - Governor of Jakarta and former Minister of Education and Culture
Djarot Saiful Hidayat - Governor of Jakarta and former Mayor of Blitar
Pratikno - Minister of State Secretariat (2014-present)
Retno Marsudi – Minister of Foreign Affairs (2014-present), former Indonesian Ambassador to Netherlands
Roy Suryo - Minister of Youth and Sports Affairs (2013-2014)
Basuki Hadimuljono - Minister of Public Works and Housing (2014-present)
Dewa Made Beratha - Governor of Bali Province (1998-2008)
Ben Mang Reng Say - politician, founder and rector of Atma Jaya Catholic University
Budiman Sudjatmiko - politician
Mahfud MD - former chief constitutional judge, politician
Muhaimin Iskandar - leader of Partai Kebangkitan Bangsa, former Minister of Labor and Transmigration (2009-2014)
Piet Alexander Tallo - Governor of East Nusa Tenggara (1998-2008)
Budi Karya Sumadi -  Minister of Transportation (2016-present)

Religion
Ahmad Wahib – progressive Islamic intellectual

Science and technology
Marlina Flassy - anthropologist and first woman Dean at Cenderawasih University
Herman Johannes - rector; Minister of public works (1950-1951)
Mohammad Sadli - Minister of Mineral Resources (1973-1978), Minister of Labor (1971-1973), Professor of Economics at University of Indonesia
Teuku Jacob - rector, physician, anatomist, palaeoanthropologist
Lolo Soetoro - geographer and stepfather of Barack Obama, the 44th President of the United States.

Government officials
 Kristiarto Legowo, Ministry of Foreign Affairs

References 

Gadjah Mada University
 
Gadjah Mada University alumni